Moment of Danger (also known as Malaga) is a 1960 British crime drama film starring Trevor Howard, Dorothy Dandridge and Edmund Purdom. It was filmed in Europe in the late months of 1959.

The film proved to be the final completed film for Dorothy Dandridge.

Plot
Starting with a wordless jewel heist pulled-off by thief Peter Curran and locksmith John Bain, Curran then double-crosses his accomplice, dumps his lover Gianna and escapes with his ill-gotten gains.  In the aftermath Gianna teams up with Bain and the two of them decide to even the score with Curran, developing feelings for each other along the way.

Cast
 Trevor Howard as John Bain
 Dorothy Dandridge as Gianna
 Edmund Purdom as Peter Carran
 Michael Hordern as Inspector Farrell
 Paul Stassino as Juan Montoya
 John Bailey as Cecil
 Alfred Burke as Shapley
 Peter Illing as Pawnbroker
 Martin Boddey as Sir John Middleburgh

Background
Before the film's release, Jet magazine said it "concerns a girl ... and a man ... who, broke and stranded, are on the run from the law...(at one point) the girl goes out and gets money as a prostitute."  One author describes Michael Hordern's appearance in the movie as a "sympathetic copper who knows that Trevor Howard is a jewel thief – thanks to Howard's double-crossing partner Edmond Purdom – but lacks the evidence to make an arrest."

In the film Dorothy Dandridge was cast as a woman of colour of European descent with the Italian name of Gianna.  In some pre-release publicity, one magazine article made a point of saying that when Trevor Howard's character kissed Dorothy, it was the first time in her career that she had received an on-screen kiss from a white man. This was not so as the actors barely touched throughout, but director László Benedek created some strongly understated sexual tension. The actress' first screen kiss so described occurred when starring with German actor Curd Jürgens in the 1958 Italian production Tamango.

References

External links
 

1960 films
1960 crime drama films
British crime drama films
Films set in London
Films set in Spain
British chase films
1960s chase films
1960s English-language films
Warner Bros. films
Films shot at Associated British Studios
Films directed by László Benedek
1960s British films